The Complete Last Waltz is a live rock show put on by Golden Gate Presents, including all 41 songs from the historic 1976 rock and roll concert The Last Waltz.  Thirty eight musicians from current rock bands participated in the original presentation on November 24, 2012 at The Warfield Theater in San Francisco. In 2013, 2014, 2016 & 2018 the show was performed at The Capitol Theatre in Port Chester, NY.

The Musical Director for the show is Sam Cohen, and the core band is composed of Joe Russo on drums, Dave Dreiwitz on bass, Marco Benevento on keyboards, Scott Metzger on guitar, Josh Kaufman, Jon Shaw, and Alecia Chakour. The horn section is composed of Stuart D. Bogie, Martín Perna, Jordan McLean, Raymond Mason and John Altieri, also known as "the Antibalas horns". Since 2013, Jeff Chimenti has been added on piano to the core band.

Additional band members include or have included Cass McCombs, Kevin Morby, Wilco’s Nels Cline, Clap Your Hands Say Yeah’s Alec Ounsworth, The Dap-Kings’ Binky Griptite, Fruit Bats' Eric D. Johnson (formerly of The Shins), Blitzen Trapper’s Eric Earley, The Low Anthem’s Jocie Adams, Vetiver’s Andy Cabic, The Long Winters’ John Roderick, Nada Surf’s Ira Elliot, Apollo Sunshine’s Jeremy Black, Nicole Atkins, Guster’s Ryan Miller, The Parkington Sisters, Delta Spirit’s Matthew Logan Vasquez, Rob Burger, Scott McMicken and Eric Slick of Dr. Dog, and Ian Ball of Gomez.

2012 Performance

2013 Performance

2014 Performance

2016 Performance

2018 Performance

2023 Performance

References

External links

Concerts in the United States
The Band